"Incredible" is a song by Keith Murray and LL Cool J, released as the only single from Murray's third album It's a Beautiful Thing. It was produced by Erick Sermon and made it to two Billboard charts, peaking at 70 on the Hot R&B/Hip-Hop Songs and 36 on the Hot Rap Singles.

Music video
A music video directed by Diane Martel was released for the song. The music video, a parody of comics' Batman and Robin, starred Murray as the Robin-inspired "Lyrical Lexicon" and Redman as the Batman-inspired "Funk Doctor Spock". The two faced LL Cool J as the duo's archnemesis based on The Joker called "The Last Laugher", Erick Sermon as "The Green Eyed Bandit", Craig Mack as "Sinister James", and the Catwoman-styled character "Chickenhead".

Samples
Underground Hip hop supergroup Army of the Pharaohs sampled the song for their song "The Ultimatum" from the album The Unholy Terror.

Single track listing
"Incredible" (Clean Version)- 3:00
"Incredible" (Instrumental)- 3:00
"Incredible" (Album Version)- 3:00
"Incredible" (Acapella)- 3:00

Charts

1998 singles
Keith Murray (rapper) songs
LL Cool J songs
Song recordings produced by Erick Sermon
Songs written by LL Cool J